There is a lack of reliable data about domestic violence in New Zealand, where it is often called family violence or family harm. The definition under the relevant New Zealand law includes not only intimate partner violence but also violence against other family members, including children and extended family or whanau, as well as people living together in the same household, such as flatmates. Domestic violence can occur in a range of relationships including (but not limited to) romantic relationships (heterosexual or homosexual) and other familial relationships.

New legislation by the NZ government alongside advocacy groups such as the White Ribbon Campaign seek to reduce the occurrence of Domestic violence in New Zealand.

Prevalence 
The prevalence of domestic violence in New Zealand is difficult to assess. The 2018 New Zealand Crime and Victims Survey, conducted by the Ministry of Justice, estimates that about a fifth of women and a tenth of men in New Zealand experience one or more episodes of intimate partner violence during their lifetime. This survey also found that 94% of sexual assaults were not reported to police, which is said to limit the understanding of the prevalence of domestic violence in New Zealand.

Government and Law enforcement response, 
In recent years the government has established the It's not OK! campaign to raise awareness amongst New Zealanders. The campaign advocates that family violence should be a concern to everybody and encourages both victims and perpetrators to seek help.

In 2018 Police introduced a different way of responding to what they called family harm which sought to intervene at the earliest opportunity, rather than repeatedly responding to incidents between the same two parties that got progressively worse.

Research 
Family Violence Clearing House

Legislation

See also 
 Domestic violence against men
 Violence against women in New Zealand

External links

References 

New Zealand
Violence in New Zealand
Violence against women in New Zealand